The 1980 National Camogie League is a competition in the women's team field sport of camogie was won by Kilkenny, who defeated Tipperary in the final, played at Roscrea.

Arrangements
Kilkenny defeated Limerick, Cork and Galway en route to the final. Tipperary defeated Clare, Down and Wexford by 3–9 to 2–7. Tipperary then defeated Dublin in the semi-final while Kilkenny had a bye to the final. Barbara Redmond was missing from the Dublin team for the League semi-final, the second yearthat a league semi-final involving Dublin went to extra time.

The Final
Both sides were without their first choice goalkeepers for the final, Mary O'Brien a student at Thomond College having gone to America and Teresa O'Neill on holiday in America. As a contest the final was over early in the second half when Kilkenny led by 3–4 to 0–1, thanks to two goals from Angea Downey and one from Mary Purcell, Tipperary's only point coming from a placed ball from a thirty. Agnes Hourigan wrote in the Irish Press: From the longest serving members to Anna Whelan from Castlecomer, who was playing in her first final, Kilkenny proved themselves skilled, fast and celevr exponents of the game. Tipperary, who had promised so much in their game with Dublin in the semi-final, did not live up to that performance and must feel very disappointed with how they played.

Division 2
The Junior National League, known since 2006 as Division Two, was won by Armagh who defeated Kildare in the final.

Final stages

References

External links
 Camogie Association

National Camogie League
1980